Life in Lucidity is the second full-length album by Canadian progressive metal band The Kindred. It is their first album recorded for Sumerian Records and also marks their final album with vocalist Dave Journeaux and drummer Mike Ieradi before their departures.

Track listing 
All songs written by The Kindred.

Personnel
The Kindred
Dave Journeaux – vocals
Ben Davis – guitar
Steve Rennie – guitar
Mike Ieradi – drums
Eric Stone – bass guitar
Matt Young – keyboard
Production
Produced/engineered/mixed by John Paul Peters
Mastered by Ed Brooks
Additional personnel
Amanda Buhse – choir/chorus
Jeff Buhse – choir/chorus
Rachal Moody – violin
Kristel Peters – choir/chorus
Mike Plummer – trumpet
Scott Reimer – choir/chorus

References

The Kindred (band) albums
2014 albums